Enrique Parada Salvatierra (born November 4, 1981) is a Bolivian footballer who most recently played for San José.

International career
He earned 8 caps for the Bolivia national football team and represented his country in 4 FIFA World Cup qualification matches.

Honours

References

External links
 
 
 

1981 births
Living people
People from Iténez Province
Association football defenders
Bolivian footballers
Bolivia international footballers
Club San José players
Club Bolívar players
The Strongest players